Sir William James Baptist (better known by his stage name, Sir the Baptist) is an American multi-disciplinary contemporary artist and songwriter. He has worked as producer and writer on two GRAMMY Award nominated albums, two GMA Dove Awards winners, two Stellar Awards winners a BMI Award as songwriter, and is BET Award-nominated artist,

As a humanitarian, he builds luxury mission homes for Missionaries of the Christian faith. He is the Chaplain of Innovation, the majority shareholder and architect of Christian website tymple.

Early life
Baptist was born William James Stovall, and raised in the Bronzeville neighborhood on Chicago's South Side as the 20th child of the late family patriarch, Dr. James Benton Stovall. His  father was born in 1924 on the land his family farmed and owned slaves, he later became a traveling pastor and Christian apologist, during the Great Migration. His mother Patricia Ann Harris, is a transatlantic missionary from roots of Sierra Leone who served communities in 17 countries with Baptist as he toured America and Europe.

Name 
Born into the Stovall lineage, his name, "Baptist" was adopted as a ceremonial name deriving from his father’s occupation as a Baptist preacher. His name, Sir, was ascribed during his parochial school years at Saint Leo Catholic. Professionally, the epithet "Sir the Baptist" was used because his model for evangelizing Jesus Christ in the wild was adopted from the prophet, John the Baptist. Sir practiced ritualistic baptisms at music festivals in America and at 22 shows across Europe.

Baptism tradition 
Baptist was the 13th generation to be baptized. His ancestors practiced the Baptist tradition on their transatlantic journey during the English Separatist movement in the 1600s. With his Stovall bloodline, the Protestant Reformation to the Church of England (Anglicans) during the separation from the Roman Catholic Church can be traced back for centuries. The first recorded baptism in Baptist’s bloodline can be traced to George Stovall II in the year 1555, in Guildford, Sussex Co., England.

Career
Baptist worked as Director of Digital Marketing and Media for McDonald's campaigns at Leo Burnett Company, Inc. His work ranged from digital marketing, to writing music scores for a film that featured Meghan Markle, to jingles with Ira Antelis (Be Like Mike). After a dispute over the ownership to his publishing rights with the agency, he became homeless, and drove for Lyft until he signed a deal with Atlantic Records/Warner Music Group in New York City with Craig Kallman, Julie Greenwald and Michael Kyser.

Baptist's conversion to Christianity was due to a marijuana experience, and that his debut release Saint or Sinner was a blueprint to the urban Christian believers. He has toured Europe with Nelly, Mary J. Blige, and August Alsina.

Artist collaborations 
Baptist has collaborated with musical artists Anthony Hamilton, Donald Lawrence, Kierra Sheard, Killer Mike, Twista, Michelle Williams, Tony Bennett, Pharrell Williams, Musiq Soulchild, Brandy Norwood, Estelle, Tori Kelly, Elle Varner, DC Young Fly,

Brand partnerships 
Baptist has partnered with companies, agencies, and lifestyle brands Facebook, Apple, Google, Lexus, Glenfiddich, Samsung, McDonald's, W Hotels, Lyft, WeWork, Toyota, Tidal, Yeti, Converse, Vans, Macy’s, The Chicago Bears, The Recording Academy, VH1 Save the Music Foundation, Fat Tire and Pandora.

Discography

Singles

Creflo Almighty Dollar (feat. Twista & ChurchPpl) – 2015
Wake Up – 2015
Raise Hell (feat. ChurchPpl) – 2015
What We Got (feat. Donald Lawrence & ChurchPpl) – 2016
Movin – 2017
He Heard My Cry – 2018
I Still Love You – 2019
Me & God – 2019
Bossa Nova – 2019
Switched Partners – 2019
Kingdom Come – 2019
Can't Help Myself (feat. Saint Ashleey, Estelle, MC Lyte, Syleena Johnson, Ann Nesby, & Boys & Girls Clubs of the Gulf Coast) – 2020
Scream & Shout – 2020
Jesus In The Ghetto (feat. Anthony Hamilton) – 2021
Adam & Eve'n (feat. Saint Ashleey) – 2021

Albums

Saint or Sinner – 2017, Atlantic Records
Godfidence: Kingdom Bae – 2020, tymple

Awards

Political views
Baptist supported Hillary Clinton in the 2016 United States presidential election. In August 2016, Baptist taunted a Donald Trump impersonator on stage for his Afropunk Festival performance in Brooklyn. He has also been quoted saying that Donald Trump is "way out of touch" with the African American community. Baptist has partnered with the Boys and Girls Clubs of America, VH1 Save the Music, and Global Citizen.

References

External links
Official website

Atlantic Records artists
Musicians from Chicago
Living people
Year of birth missing (living people)